The South Wales FA Senior Cup is the regional knock-out competition for clubs beneath the umbrella of the South Wales Football Association, in the Welsh Football Pyramid in South Wales.

History
The cup was originally called the South Wales & Monmouthshire Senior Cup, run by the South Wales and Monmouthshire Football Association  until after the 1967–68 season.

Previous winners
Information sourced from the South Wales Football Association website.

1890s

 1893–94: – Builth
 1894–95: – Rhayader
 1895–96: – Barry District & Brecon
 1896–97: – Rogerstone
 1897–98: – Rogerstone
 1898–99: – Barry Unionists
 1899–1900: – Aberystwyth

1900s

 1900–01: – Barry Unionists
 1901–02: – Aberdare
 1902–03: – Aberaman
 1903–04: – Treharris
 1904–05: – Ebbw Vale
 1905–06: – Treharris
 1906–07: – Treharris
 1907–08: – Ton Pentre
 1908–09: – Ton Pentre
 1909–10: – Ton Pentre

1910s

 1910–11: – Treharris
 1911–12: – Merthyr Town
 1912–13: – Aberdare
 1913–14: – Cardiff City
 1914–15: – Ton Pentre
 1915–16: – No competition - World War One
 1916–17: – No competition - World War One
 1917–18: – No competition - World War One
 1918–19: – No competition - World War One
 1919–20: – Mid Rhondda

1920s

 1920–21: – Ton Pentre
 1921–22: – Cardiff City
 1922–23: – Cardiff City
 1923–24: – Cardiff City
 1924–25: – Pontypridd
 1925–26: – Aberdare & Mid Rhondda
 1926–27: – Barry
 1927–28: – Cardiff City
 1928–29: – Cardiff City
 1929–30: – Swansea Town

1930s

 1930–31: – Lovells Athletic
 1931–32: – Swansea Town
 1932–33: – Swansea Town
 1933–34: – Swansea Town
 1934–35: – Lovells Athletic
 1935–36: – Barry
 1936–37: – Lovells Athletic
 1937–38: – Barry
 1938–39: – Barry
 1939–40: – No competition - World War Two

1940s

 1940–41: – No competition - World War Two
 1941–42: – No competition - World War Two
 1942–43: – No competition - World War Two
 1943–44: – No competition - World War Two
 1944–45: – No competition - World War Two
 1945–46: – Merthyr Tydfil
 1946–47: – Troedyrhiw
 1947–48: – Ton Pentre
 1948–49: – Lovells Athletic
 1949–50: – Merthyr Tydfil

1950s

 1950–51: – Merthyr Tydfil
 1951–52: – Merthyr Tydfil
 1952–53: – Barry Town
 1953–54: – Barry Town
 1954–55: – Lovells Athletic
 1955–56: – Merthyr Tydfil
 1956–57: – Cwmparc
 1957–58: – Cardiff City
 1958–59: – Barry Town
 1959–60: – Barry Town

1960s

 1960–61: – Ton Pentre
 1961–62: – Ton Pentre
 1962–63: – Cardiff City
 1963–64: – Ton Pentre
 1964–65: – Abergavenny Thursdays
 1965–66: – Barry Town
 1966–67: – Cardiff College of Education
 1967–68: – Merthyr Tydfil
 1968–69: – Cardiff City
 1969–70: – Cardiff City

1970s

 1970–71: – Cardiff City
 1971–72: – Cardiff City
 1972–73: – Cardiff City
 1973–74: – Cardiff City
 1974–75: – Cardiff City
 1975–76: – Barry Town
 1976–77: – Merthyr Tydfil
 1977–78: – Barry Town
 1978–79: – Maesteg Park Athletic
 1979–80: – Merthyr Tydfil

1980s

 1980–81: – Sully
 1981–82: – Sully
 1982–83: – Ton Pentre
 1983–84: – Barry Town
 1984–85: – Merthyr Tydfil
 1985–86: – Sully
 1986–87: – Barry Town
 1987–88: – Barry Town
 1988–89: – Merthyr Tydfil
 1989–90: – Merthyr Tydfil

1990s

 1990–91: – Maesteg Park
 1991–92: – Barry Town
 1992–93: – Ton Pentre
 1993–94: – No competition
 1994–95: – No competition
 1995–96: – No competition
 1996–97: – No competition
 1997–98: – No competition
 1998–99: – No competition
 1999–2000: – No competition

2000s

 2000–01: – No competition
 2001–02: – No competition
 2002–03: –  Stanleytown
 2003–04: –  Ynyshir Albions
 2004–05: –  Carnetown
 2005–06: –  Grange Albion
 2006–07: –  Pantyscallog Village Juniors
 2007–08: –  Bridgend Street
 2008–09: –  Penydarren BGC
 2009–10: –  Rhoose

2010s

 2010–11: – Llantwit Major 
 2011–12: – Cwmbach Royal Stars
 2012–13: – STM Sports
 2013–14: – Penydarren BGC
 2014–15: – Cornelly United 
 2015–16: – Taffs Well
 2016–17: – Taffs Well
 2017–18: – AFC Whitchurch
 2018–19: – Llanrumney United
 2019–20: – Competition cancelled - Covid-19 pandemic

2020s

 2020–21: – No competition - Covid-19 pandemic
 2021–22: – Cwrt Rawlin

Number of competition wins

Barry / Barry Town — 15
Cardiff City – 15
Merthyr Tydfil – 11  
Ton Pentre – 11
Lovells Athletic – 5
Swansea Town – 4
Treharris – 4
Sully– 3
Barry Unionists –2
Aberdare – 2
Maesteg Park/ Maesteg Park Athletic – 2
Penydarren BGC – 2
Rogerstone– 2
Taffs Well – 2
Aberaman – 1
Abergavenny Thursdays – 1
Aberystwyth – 1
AFC Whitchurch – 1
Barry District & Brecon – 1
Bridgend Street – 1
Builth – 1
Cardiff College of Education – 1
Carnetown – 1
Cornelly United – 1 
Cwmbach Royal Stars – 1
Cwmparc – 1
Cwrt Rawlin – 1
Ebbw Vale – 1
Llanrumney United – 1
Llantwit Major – 1
Merthyr Town – 1
Mid Rhondda – 1
Mid Rhondda & Aberdare – 1
Pantyscallog Village Juniors – 1
Pontypridd – 1
Rhayader – 1
Rhoose – 1
Stanleytown – 1
Troedyrhiw – 1
STM Sports – 1
Ynyshir Albions – 1

References

Football cup competitions in Wales
1893 establishments in Wales
Football in Wales
County Cup competitions
Recurring events established in 1893